

The SET 7 was a military trainer and reconnaissance aircraft that was produced in Romania in the mid-1930s. It was originally designed as a conventional single-bay biplane, with slightly staggered wings, a standard undercarriage with fixed tailskid, and a tandem open-cockpit arrangement for the pilot and instructor or observer. Power was supplied by an Armstrong Siddeley Jaguar radial engine, and from the outset the aircraft was equipped for wireless and photographic reconnaissance duties.

An armed version followed in 1934, adding a trainable machine gun for the observer and a fixed machine gun for the pilot. This version, the 7K, was powered by a neatly cowled Gnome-Rhône 7Ksd engine, and the 7KB (fitted with bomb racks) and 7KD were specialised subtypes that followed it. A floatplane version was produced as the 7H.

Variants
SET 7 - initial unarmed trainer version with Armstrong Siddeley Jaguar engine (50 built, 1932–1934)
SET 7K - armed reconnaissance version with Gnome-Rhône 7Ksd/7Ksf engine (20 built, delivered by August 1936)
SET 7KB - 7K fitted with IAR-built Barbieri-type bomb racks (20 built, delivered by September 1937)
SET 7KD - 7K stripped of most equipment and used for liaison duties (Divizionar - "army division use") (20 built, delivered between October and December 1938)
SET 7H - floatplane for Romanian Navy

Operators

Royal Romanian Air Force
Royal Romanian Navy
Transnistrian air section

Specifications (7K)

References

Further reading

External links

Уголок неба
Aviatia magazine website 

1930s Romanian military trainer aircraft
1930s Romanian military reconnaissance aircraft
S07
Single-engined tractor aircraft
Biplanes
Aircraft first flown in 1931